Cyrillic numerals are a numeral system derived from the Cyrillic script, developed in the First Bulgarian Empire in the late 10th century. It was used in the First Bulgarian Empire and by South and East Slavic peoples. The system was used in Russia as late as the early 18th century, when Peter the Great replaced it with Arabic numerals as part of his civil script reform initiative. Cyrillic numbers played a role in Peter the Great's currency reform plans, too, with silver wire kopecks issued after 1696 and mechanically minted coins issued between 1700 and 1722 inscribed with the date using Cyrillic numerals. By 1725, Russian Imperial coins had transitioned to Arabic numerals. The Cyrillic numerals may still be found in books written in the Church Slavonic language.

General description
The system is a quasi-decimal alphabetic numeral system, equivalent to the Ionian numeral system but written with the corresponding graphemes of the Cyrillic script. The order is based on the original Greek alphabet rather than the standard Cyrillic alphabetical order. 

A separate letter is assigned to each unit (1, 2, ... 9), each multiple of ten (10, 20, ... 90), and each multiple of one hundred (100, 200, ... 900). To distinguish numbers from text, a titlo is sometimes drawn over the numbers, or they are set apart with dots. The numbers are written as pronounced in Slavonic, generally from the high value position to the low value position, with the exception of 11 through 19, which are written and pronounced with the ones unit before the tens; for example, ЗІ (17) is "семнадсять" (literally seven-on-ten, cf. the English seven-teen).

Examples:
  – 1706
  – 7118
A long titlo may be used for long runs of numbers: .

To evaluate a Cyrillic number, the values of all the figures are added up: for example, ѰЗ is 700 + 7, making 707. If the number is greater than 999 (ЦЧѲ), the thousands sign (҂) is used to multiply the number's value: for example, ҂Ѕ is 6000, while ҂Л҂В is parsed as 30,000 + 2000, making 32,000. To produce larger numbers, a modifying sign is used to encircle the number being multiplied. Two scales existed in such cases (similar to the long and short scales): one is 'Малый счёт' or Lesser count giving a new name and sign /every order of magnitude/, and the other is 'Великий счёт' or Greater Count (both are squaring except for the end—extending to 10 in the 49th power).

Table of values

 In some varieties of Western Cyrillic, Ҁ was used for 90, and Ч was used for 60 instead of Ѯ.

Computing codes

See also
Early Cyrillic alphabet
Glagolitic alphabet
Glagolitic numerals
Greek numerals
Relationship of Cyrillic and Glagolitic scripts

References

External links 

Numerals
Cyrillo-Methodian studies
Numeral systems
Numerals
Science and technology in Russia